Attwood is a suburb in Melbourne, Victoria, Australia,  north-west of Melbourne's Central Business District, located within the City of Hume local government area. Attwood recorded a population of 3,309 at the 2021 census.

Attwood is home to Victoria Police's driver training track, Dog Squad and Mounted Branch. The Melway describes this area as 'Strictly out of Bounds'. The suburb is located south of Greenvale, along Mickleham Road.

See also
 Shire of Bulla – Attwood was previously within this former local government area.

References

Suburbs of Melbourne
Suburbs of the City of Hume